Latent period may refer to:

Latent period (epidemiology), the time interval between when an individual is infected by a pathogen and when he or she becomes capable of infecting other susceptible individuals.
Muscle contraction, the time between a stimulus to the nerve and the contraction of the muscle
Virus latency, a period during which a virus remains dormant in a cell and does not proliferate

See also 
Latency stage, Sigmund Freud's child's psychosexual development model